The Ven   William Leavers MacKennal  (2 February 1881 – 20 June 1947) was an eminent Anglican priest in the first half of the 20th century.

He was educated at Rugby and Trinity College, Cambridge. He was ordained in 1908 and held curacies at Great St Mary's, Cambridge and St George, Dunster. A Chaplain to the Forces from 1915 to 1918, when peace returned he held incumbencies at Compton Martin, Chesterton, Cambridge, Kirkby Lonsdale and Hitchin. He became Archdeacon of Ely in 1942, a post he held until his death.

References

1881 births
People educated at Rugby School
Alumni of Trinity College, Cambridge
Archdeacons of Ely
1947 deaths
World War I chaplains
Royal Army Chaplains' Department officers